is the oldest extracurricular college-preparatory school in Japan. It was founded in 1918 by Toshiharu Yamazaki (山崎 寿春 Yamazaki Toshiharu), a Japanese English Literature scholar and a graduate of Amherst College, Harvard College, and Yale University (Graduate School). Along with Kawai-juku and Yoyogi Seminar, it is one of the three largest groups of preparatory schools. Sundai Preparatory School is regularly ranked as first by the number of acceptances to the University of Tokyo and Kyoto University, both considered the most competitive universities in Japan. Admission is competitive, and students must receive satisfactory grades in national examinations to enroll.

Campuses

Sundai Preparatory School

Headquarters (Ochanomizu, Tokyo)
1st building
2nd building 
3rd building 
8th building
Kyoto
Osaka
Nagoya
Yokohama
Sapporo
Fukuoka
Kobe
Hamamatsu
Sendai
Hiroshima

Sundai Center for International Education
Singapore
Malaysia
Bangkok
Jakarta
Hongkong
Shanghai
Pudong
Taipei
Myanmar
Tokyo
New York
New Jersey 
Michigan
Düsseldorf

Departments
These subjects are all required by top-tier universities in Japan.
English
Mathematics
Contemporary Japanese
Classical Japanese language
Classical Chinese
Physics
Chemistry
Biology
Geoscience
History of Japan
World history
Geography
Civics

Affiliated institutions
 Sundai Michigan International Academy
 Sundai Ireland International School (closed)

References

Further reading
"駿台予備校ジュニア失踪 豪州「大スキャンダル」が伏線 (ワイド特集 誰にも言えない由々しい話)." 週刊文春 42(45), 36-38, 2000-11-30. 文芸春秋. See profile at CiNii.
"スクープ 駿台予備校学園長 長男に「遺産ゼロ円」って." 週刊現代 52(12), 162-165, 2010-03-27. 講談社. See profile at CiNii.

External links
 

Private schools in Japan